Yläne is a former municipality of Finland. It was consolidated to Pöytyä on 1 January 2009.

It is located in the province of Western Finland and is part of the Southwest Finland region. The municipality had a population of 2,119 (2004-12-31) and covered an area of 364.76 km2 of which 21.99 km2 is water. The population density was 6.18 inhabitants per km2.

The municipality was unilingually Finnish.

External links

Pöytyä – Official website 

Former municipalities of Finland
Populated places disestablished in 2009
2009 disestablishments in Finland